England competed at the 1938 British Empire Games in Sydney, New South Wales, Australia, from 5 February to 12 February 1938.

The athletes that competed are listed below.

Athletes

Athletics

Boxing

Cycling

Diving

Lawn bowls

Rowing

Swimming

Wrestling

References

1938
Nations at the 1938 British Empire Games
British Empire Games